Albert Prosa (born 1 October 1990) is an Estonian professional footballer who plays as a forward.

Club career

Tammeka
Prosa began playing football for local club Tammeka. He made his debut in the Meistriliiga on 15 March 2008, in a 1–2 home loss to TVMK. In July 2011, Prosa had a trial at Borussia Dortmund, but failed to secure a contract with the German champions. He scored 22 goals in 33 matches in the 2011 season.

Flora
On 24 November 2011, Prosa signed three-year contract with Meistriliiga club Flora. Prosa won the Meistriliiga title in the 2015 season. On 20 July 2016, Prosa's contract was terminated by mutual agreement. He scored 61 goals in 126 in the Meistriliiga for Flora.

RoPS
On 12 August 2016, Prosa signed for Veikkausliiga club RoPS until the end of the 2016 season.

FCI Tallinn
On 1 February 2017, Prosa signed a one-year contract with Meistriliiga club FCI Tallinn. He made his debut for FCI Tallinn on 26 February, in the Estonian Supercup match against Flora, and scored twice in his side's 5–0 victory. On 27 May 2017, Prosa scored the second goal of a 2–0 victory over Tammeka in the Estonian Cup final. He was joint top scorer in the Meistriliiga in the 2017 season, alongside Rauno Sappinen, with 27 goals.

Valletta
On 6 December 2017, Prosa signed a one-and-a-half-year contract with Maltese Premier League club Valletta.

TPS
On 8 August 2018, Prosa signed for Veikkausliiga club TPS until the end of the season. He left the club at the end of 2018.

Tammeka
Prosa joined Tartu JK Tammeka on 11 February 2019 on a contract for the rest of the year.

International career
Prosa made an unofficial debut for Estonia on 25 May 2011, in a non-FIFA match against Basque Country. He made his official senior debut on 19 June 2011, in a 0–4 loss to Chile in a friendly. Prosa scored his first international goal on 6 January 2016, in a 1–1 friendly draw against Sweden.

International goals
As of 25 December 2017. Estonia score listed first, score column indicates score after each Prosa goal.

Honours

Club
Flora
Meistriliiga: 2015
Estonian Cup: 2012–13, 2015–16
Estonian Supercup: 2014, 2016

FCI Tallinn
Estonian Cup: 2016–17
Estonian Supercup: 2017

Valletta
Maltese Premier League: 2017–18
Maltese FA Trophy: 2017–18

Individual
Meistriliiga top scorer: 2017

References

External links

1990 births
Living people
Sportspeople from Tartu
Estonian footballers
Association football forwards
Esiliiga players
Meistriliiga players
Tartu JK Tammeka players
FC Flora players
FCI Tallinn players
Veikkausliiga players
Rovaniemen Palloseura players
Turun Palloseura footballers
Maltese Premier League players
Valletta F.C. players
Estonia youth international footballers
Estonia under-21 international footballers
Estonia international footballers
Estonian expatriate footballers
Estonian expatriate sportspeople in Finland
Expatriate footballers in Finland
Expatriate footballers in Malta
Estonian expatriate sportspeople in Malta